The 1978–79 Scottish League Cup final was played on 31 March 1979 and was the final of the 33rd Scottish League Cup competition. It was contested by Rangers and Aberdeen. Rangers won the match 2–1 thanks to goals by Colin Jackson and Alex MacDonald.

Match details

See also
 Aberdeen F.C.–Rangers F.C. rivalry

External links 
 Soccerbase

1979 03
League Cup Final
Aberdeen F.C. matches
Rangers F.C. matches
1970s in Glasgow
Scottish League Cup Final